The 1995–96 Hartford Whalers season was the 24th season of the franchise, 17th season in the NHL. The Whalers missed the playoffs for the fourth consecutive season.

Off-season
On May 31, the Whalers acquired a fourth round draft pick in the 1995 NHL Entry Draft from the Los Angeles Kings in exchange for Jan Vopat.

The Whalers participated in the 1995 NHL Entry Draft held at the Edmonton Coliseum in Edmonton, Alberta on July 8. With their first round selection, 13th overall, Hartford selected Jean-Sébastien Giguère from the Halifax Mooseheads of the Quebec Major Junior Hockey League. Giguere had a record of 14-27-5 with a 3.94 GAA and a .889 save percentage with the Mooseheads during the 1994-95 season. In the fourth round, the club selected Sami Kapanen from HIFK of the SM-liiga. In 49 games, Kapanen scored 14 goals and 42 points. Other notable players the Whalers selected in the draft include Ian MacNeil, Byron Ritchie and Mike Rucinski.

Hartford signed free agent Jeff Daniels on July 18. Daniels played in three games with the Florida Panthers during the 1994-95, earning no points. He played a majority of the season with the Detroit Vipers of the IHL, scoring eight goals and 20 points in 25 games.

On July 27, the Whalers and St. Louis Blues were involved in a blockbuster trade. Hartford acquired Brendan Shanahan from the Blues in exchange for Chris Pronger. In 45 games during the 1994-95 season, Shanahan scored 20 goals and 41 points. Shanahan had back-to-back 50+ goal seasons in 1992-93 and 1993-94. Shanahan was named to the NHL First All-Star Team during the 1993-94 season, as he scored 52 goals and 102 points in 81 games, while accumulating 211 penalty minutes.

The Whalers signed free agent Gerald Diduck on August 24. Diduck split the 1994-95 season between the Vancouver Canucks and Chicago Blackhawks. In 35 games, he scored two goals and five points.

On October 6, the Whalers acquired Nelson Emerson in a trade with the Winnipeg Jets in exchange for Darren Turcotte. In 1994-95, Emerson scored 14 goals and 37 points in 48 games with the Jets. During the 1993-94 season, Emerson scored a career high 33 goals and 74 points in 83 games with Winnipeg. Also, on October 6, at the NHL Waiver Draft, the Whalers selected Jason Muzzatti from the Calgary Flames. Muzzatti had a 10-14-4 record with the Saint John Flames during the 1994-95 season.

Regular season
Against the Hartford Whalers on March 6, 1996, Chris Osgood became the third goaltender in NHL history to score a goal.

The Whalers were shutout a league-high 8 times during the Regular season.

Final standings

Schedule and results

Player statistics

Regular season
Scoring

Goaltending

Note: GP = Games played; G = Goals; A = Assists; Pts = Points; +/- = Plus-minus PIM = Penalty minutes; PPG = Power-play goals; SHG = Short-handed goals; GWG = Game-winning goals;
      MIN = Minutes played; W = Wins; L = Losses; T = Ties; GA = Goals against; GAA = Goals-against average;  SO = Shutouts; SA=Shots against; SV=Shots saved; SV% = Save percentage;

Awards and records

Transactions
The Whalers were involved in the following transactions during the 1995–96 season.

Trades

Waivers

Free agents

Draft picks
Hartford's picks at the 1995 NHL Entry Draft held at the Edmonton Coliseum in Edmonton, Alberta.

See also
1995–96 NHL season

References
 Whalers on Hockey Database

 

1995-96
1995–96 NHL season by team
1995–96 in American ice hockey by team
1995 in sports in Connecticut
1996 in sports in Connecticut